Jennifer Ann Love is an American professor of chemistry at the University of Calgary. She is a Fellow of the Chemical Institute of Canada.

Early life and education 
Love was born in New England. She grew up in Rochester, New York. Love realized she was interested in science whilst at high school, but it was not until the second year of college that she realized that her favourite science was chemistry. She was an undergraduate student at Allegheny College, and graduated magna cum laude. She moved to Stanford University for graduate studies, where she studied metal-catalyzed reactions to generate seven membered rings. Her thesis considered rhodium-catalysed cycloadditions, and was amongst the first studies to create a biologically active natural product. At Stanford, Love worked in the laboratory of Paul Wender.

Research and career 
Love joined the California Institute of Technology as National Institutes of Health postdoctoral fellow with Robert H. Grubbs. She studied the reaction mechanism for olefin metathesis.

In 2003, Love moved to Canada to start her independent scientific career at the University of British Columbia. At UBC, Love led a research group on organometallic chemistry. She also served as Senior Advisor on Women Faculty.

Love moved to the University of Calgary in 2019, where she looked at how the metallic center influences the reactivity.

Awards and honors 
 2008 AstraZeneca Canada Award
 2018 Intellisyn Pharma Award
 2021 Elected Fellow of the Chemical Institute of Canada

Selected publications

Personal life 
Love is married to Pierre Kennepohl, a chemist at the University of Calgary. She spends her free time kayaking.

References

External links 

Living people
American women chemists
Allegheny College alumni
Stanford University alumni
Academic staff of the University of Calgary
Year of birth missing (living people)
21st-century American women scientists